The Great Sphinx of Giza is a limestone statue of a reclining sphinx, a mythical creature with the head of a human, and the body of a lion. Facing directly from west to east, it stands on the Giza Plateau on the west bank of the Nile in Giza, Egypt. The face of the Sphinx appears to represent the pharaoh Khafre.

The original shape of the Sphinx was cut from the bedrock, and has since been restored with layers of limestone blocks. It is uncertain why the Sphinx’s nose was broken off. According to a popular myth, the Sphinx’s nose was broken by cannonballs fired by Napoleon Bonaparte’s army during one of the military battles of the French campaign in Egypt in 1798. However, this is refuted by several sources predating the birth of Napoleon. Not only are there paintings from the 17th century which depict the Sphinx in this way but the 15th century Arab historian al-Maqrīzī also acknowledged its broken nose, attributing it to a Sufi Muslim extremist called Mohamed Sa'm al-Dahr who he claimed broke it in 1378 and was later executed for vandalism. However, this is also unlikely to be the case as an archaeological study performed by Mark Lehner concluded that although the Sphinx’s nose was intentionally broken, as opposed to being damaged by weather and corrosion, it happened sometime between the 3rd and 10th centuries.

The Sphinx is the oldest known monumental sculpture in Egypt and one of the most recognizable statues in the world. The archaeological evidence suggests that it was created by ancient Egyptians of the Old Kingdom during the reign of Khafre.

Names 
The original name the Old Kingdom creators gave the Sphinx is unknown, as the Sphinx temple, enclosure and possibly the Sphinx itself were not completed at the time, and thus cultural material was limited. In the New Kingdom, the Sphinx was revered as the solar deity Hor-em-akhet (Hellenized: Harmachis), and the pharaoh Thutmose IV (1401–1391 or 1397–1388 BC) specifically referred to it as such in his Dream Stele.

The commonly used name "Sphinx" was given to it in classical antiquity, about 2,000 years after the commonly accepted date of its construction by reference to a Greek mythological beast with the head of a woman, a falcon, a cat, or a sheep and the body of a lion with the wings of an eagle. (although, like most Egyptian sphinxes, the Great Sphinx has a man's head and no wings). The English word sphinx comes from the ancient Greek Σφίγξ apparently from the verb σφίγγω (transliterated:  / ), after the Greek sphinx who strangled anyone who failed to answer her riddle.

Medieval Arab writers, including al-Maqrīzī, call the Sphinx by an Arabized Coptic name Belhib, Balhubah Belhawiyya, which in turn comes from Pehor or Pehor(o)n, a name of the Canaanite god Hauron with whom the Sphinx was identified. It's also rendered as Ablehon on a depiction of the Sphinx made by François de La Boullaye-Le Gouz. The modern Egyptian Arabic name is أبو الهول (ʼabu alhōl / ʼabu alhawl , "The Terrifying One"; literally "Father of Dread") which is a phono-semantic matching of the Coptic name.

History

Old Kingdom 

The archaeological evidence suggests that the Great Sphinx was created around 2500 BC for the pharaoh Khafre, the builder of the Second Pyramid at Giza. The Sphinx is a monolith carved from the bedrock of the plateau, which also served as the quarry for the pyramids and other monuments in the area. Egyptian geologist Farouk El-Baz has suggested that the head of the Sphinx may have been carved first, out of a natural yardang, i.e. a ridge of bedrock that had been sculpted by the wind. These can sometimes achieve shapes which resemble animals. El-Baz suggests that the "moat" or "ditch" around the Sphinx may have been quarried out later to allow for the creation of the full body of the sculpture. 

The stones cut from around the Sphinx' body were used to construct a temple in front of it, however neither the enclosure nor the temple were ever completed, and the relative scarcity of Old Kingdom cultural material suggests that a Sphinx cult was not established at the time. Selim Hassan, writing in 1949 on recent excavations of the Sphinx enclosure, made note of this circumstance:

In order to construct the temple, the northern perimeter-wall of the Khafre Valley Temple had to be deconstructed, hence it follows that the Khafre funerary complex preceded the creation of the Sphinx and its temple. Furthermore, the angle and location of the south wall of the enclosure suggests the causeway connecting Khafre's Pyramid and Valley Temple already existed before the Sphinx was planned. The lower base level of the Sphinx temple also indicates that it doesn't pre-date the Valley Temple.

New Kingdom 

Some time around the First Intermediate Period, the Giza Necropolis was abandoned, and drifting sand eventually buried the Sphinx up to its shoulders. When the stele was discovered, its lines of text were already damaged and incomplete. An excerpt reads:

The Dream Stele associates the Sphinx with Khafre, however this part of the text is not entirely intact:

Egyptologist Thomas Young, finding the Khaf hieroglyphs in a damaged cartouche used to surround a royal name, inserted the glyph ra to complete Khafre's name. When the Stele was re-excavated in 1925, the lines of text referring to Khaf flaked off and were destroyed.

Later, Ramesses II the Great (1279–1213 BC) may have undertaken a second excavation.

In the New Kingdom, the Sphinx became more specifically associated with the sun god Hor-em-akhet (Hellenized: Harmachis) or "Horus-at-the-Horizon". Pharaoh Amenhotep II (1427–1401 or 1397 BC) built a temple to the northeast of the Sphinx nearly 1000 years after its construction and dedicated it to the cult of Hor-em-akhet.

Graeco-Roman period 

In Graeco-Roman times, Giza had become a tourist destination—the monuments were regarded as antiquities—and some Roman Emperors visited the Sphinx out of curiosity, and for political reasons.

The Sphinx was cleared of sand again in the first century AD in honor of Emperor Nero and the Governor of Egypt Tiberius Claudius Balbilus. At the top of the stairs, a podium was positioned that allowed view into the Sphinx sanctuary. Further back, another podium neighbored several more steps. The stairway was dismantled during the 1931–32 excavations by Émile Baraize.

Pliny the Elder describes the face of the Sphinx being colored red and gives measurements for the statue:

A stela dated to 166 AD commemorates the restoration of the retaining walls surrounding the Sphinx. The last Emperor connected with the monument is Septimius Severus, around 200 AD. With the downfall of Roman power, the Sphinx was once more engulfed by the sands.

Middle Ages 
Some ancient non-Egyptians saw the Sphinx as a likeness of the god Horon. The cult of the Sphinx continued into medieval times. The Sabians of Harran saw it as the burial place of Hermes Trismegistus. Arab authors described the Sphinx as a talisman that guarded the area from the desert. Al-Maqrizi describes it as the "talisman of the Nile" that the locals believed the flood cycle depended upon. Muhammad al-Idrisi stated that those wishing to obtain bureaucratic positions in the Egyptian government gave incense offering to the monument.

Early European descriptions of the Great Sphinx of Giza
Over the centuries, writers and scholars have recorded their impressions and reactions upon seeing the Sphinx. The vast majority were concerned with a general description, often including a mixture of science, romance and mystique. A typical description of the Sphinx by tourists and leisure travelers throughout the 19th and 20th century was made by John Lawson Stoddard:

From the 16th to the 19th centuries, European observers described the Sphinx having the face, neck and breast of a woman.  Examples included Johannes Helferich (1579), George Sandys (1615), Johann Michael Vansleb (1677), Benoît de Maillet (1735) and Elliot Warburton (1844).

Most early Western images were book illustrations in print form, elaborated by a professional engraver from either previous images available or some original drawing or sketch supplied by an author, and usually now lost. Seven years after visiting Giza, André Thévet (Cosmographie de Levant, 1556) described the Sphinx as "the head of a colossus, caused to be made by Isis, daughter of Inachus, then so beloved of Jupiter". He, or his artist and engraver, pictured it as a curly-haired monster with a grassy dog collar. Athanasius Kircher (who never visited Egypt) depicted the Sphinx as a Roman statue (Turris Babel, 1679). Johannes Helferich's (1579) Sphinx is a pinched-face, round-breasted woman with a straight haired wig. George Sandys stated that the Sphinx was a harlot; Balthasar de Monconys interpreted the headdress as a kind of hairnet, while François de La Boullaye-Le Gouz's Sphinx had a rounded hairdo with bulky collar.

Richard Pococke's Sphinx was an adoption of Cornelis de Bruijn's drawing of 1698, featuring only minor changes, but is closer to the actual appearance of the Sphinx than anything previous.  The print versions of Norden's drawings for his Voyage d'Egypte et de Nubie, 1755 clearly show that the nose was missing.

Modern excavations 

In 1817, the first modern archaeological dig, supervised by the Italian Giovanni Battista Caviglia, uncovered the Sphinx's chest completely.

One of the people working on clearing the sands from around the Great Sphinx was Eugène Grébaut, a French Director of the Antiquities Service.

Opinions of early Egyptologists 
Early Egyptologists and excavators were of divided opinion regarding the age of the Sphinx and the associated temples.

In 1857, Auguste Mariette, founder of the Egyptian Museum in Cairo, unearthed the much later Inventory Stela (estimated to be from the Twenty-sixth Dynasty, c. 664–525 BC), which tells how Khufu came upon the Sphinx, already buried in sand. Although certain tracts on the Stela are likely accurate, this passage is contradicted by archaeological evidence, thus considered to be Late Period historical revisionism, a purposeful fake, created by the local priests as an attempt to imbue the contemporary Isis temple with an ancient history it never had. Such acts became common when religious institutions such as temples, shrines and priests' domains were fighting for political attention and for financial and economic donations.

Flinders Petrie wrote in 1883 regarding the state of opinion of the age of the Khafre Valley Temple, and by extension the Sphinx: "The date of the Granite Temple has been so positively asserted to be earlier than the fourth dynasty, that it may seem rash to dispute the point. Recent discoveries, however, strongly show that it was really not built before the reign of Khafre, in the fourth dynasty."

Gaston Maspero, the French Egyptologist and second director of the Egyptian Museum in Cairo, conducted a survey of the Sphinx in 1886. He concluded that because the Dream Stela showed the cartouche of Khafre in line 13, it was he who was responsible for the excavation and therefore the Sphinx must predate Khafre and his predecessors—possibly Fourth Dynasty, . Maspero believed the Sphinx to be "the most ancient monument in Egypt".

Ludwig Borchardt attributed the Sphinx to the Middle Kingdom, arguing that the particular features seen on the Sphinx are unique to the 12th dynasty and that the Sphinx resembles Amenemhat III.

E. A. Wallis Budge agreed that the Sphinx predated Khafre's reign, writing in The Gods of the Egyptians (1904): "This marvelous object [the Great Sphinx] was in existence in the days of Khafre, or Khephren, and it is probable that it is a very great deal older than his reign and that it dates from the end of the archaic period []."

Selim Hassan reasoned that the Sphinx was erected after the completion of the Khafre pyramid complex.

Modern dissenting hypotheses 

Rainer Stadelmann, former director of the German Archaeological Institute in Cairo, examined the distinct iconography of the nemes (headdress) and the now-detached beard of the Sphinx and concluded the style is more indicative of the pharaoh Khufu (2589–2566 BC), known to the Greeks as Cheops, builder of the Great Pyramid of Giza and Khafre's father. He supports this by suggesting Khafre's Causeway was built to conform to a pre-existing structure, which, he concludes, given its location, could only have been the Sphinx.

In 2004, Vassil Dobrev of the Institut Français d'Archéologie Orientale in Cairo announced he had uncovered new evidence that the Great Sphinx may have been the work of the little-known pharaoh Djedefre (2528–2520 BC), Khafra's half brother and a son of Khufu. Dobrev suggests Djedefre built the Sphinx in the image of his father Khufu, identifying him with the sun god Ra in order to restore respect for their dynasty. Dobrev also says that the causeway connecting Khafre's pyramid to the temples was built around the Sphinx, suggesting it was already in existence at the time. Egyptologist Nigel Strudwick responded to Dobrev saying that "It is not implausible. But I would need more explanation, such as why he thinks the pyramid at Abu Roash is a sun temple, something I'm sceptical about. I have never heard anyone suggest that the name in the graffiti at Zawiyet el-Aryan mentions Djedefre. I remain more convinced by the traditional argument of it being Khafre or the more recent theory of it being Khufu."

Recent restorations 
In 1931, engineers of the Egyptian government repaired the head of the Sphinx. Part of its headdress had fallen off in 1926 due to erosion, which had also cut deeply into its neck. This questionable repair was by the addition of a concrete collar between the headdress and the neck, creating an altered profile. Many renovations to the stone base and raw rock body were done in the 1980s, and then redone in the 1990s.

Degradation and violation 
The nummulitic limestone of the area consists of layers which offer differing resistance to erosion (mostly caused by wind and windblown sand), leading to the uneven degradation apparent in the Sphinx's body. The lowest part of the body, including the legs, is solid rock. The body of the animal up to its neck is fashioned from softer layers that have suffered considerable disintegration. The layer in which the head was sculpted is much harder. 
A number of "dead-end" shafts are known to exist within and below the body of the Great Sphinx, most likely dug by treasure hunters and tomb robbers.

Missing nose 

Examination of the Sphinx's face shows that long rods or chisels were hammered into the nose area, one down from the bridge and another beneath the nostril, then used to pry the nose off towards the south, resulting in the one-metre wide nose still being lost to date. Mark Lehner, who performed an archaeological study, concluded that it was intentionally broken with instruments at an unknown time between the 3rd and 10th centuries AD.

Drawings of the Sphinx by Frederic Louis Norden in 1737 show the nose missing. Many folk tales exist regarding the destruction of its nose, aiming to provide an answer as to where it went or what happened to it. One tale erroneously attributes it to cannonballs fired by the army of Napoleon Bonaparte. Other tales ascribe it to being the work of Mamluks. Since the 10th century, some Arab authors have claimed it to be a result of iconoclastic attacks.

The Arab historian al-Maqrīzī, writing in the 15th century, attributes the loss of the nose to Muhammad Sa'im al-Dahr, a Sufi Muslim from the khanqah of Sa'id al-Su'ada in 1378, who found the local peasants making offerings to the Sphinx in the hope of increasing their harvest and therefore defaced the Sphinx in an act of iconoclasm. According to al-Maqrīzī, many people living in the area believed that the increased sand covering the Giza Plateau was retribution for al-Dahr's act of defacement. Ibn Qadi Shuhba mentions his name as Muhammad ibn Sadiq ibn al-Muhammad al-Tibrizi al-Masri, who died in 1384. He attributed the desecration of the sphinxes of Qanatir al-Siba built by the sultan Baybars to him, and also said he might have desecrated the Great Sphinx. Al-Minufi stated that the Alexandrian Crusade in 1365 was divine punishment for a Sufi sheikh of the khanqah of Sa'id breaking off the nose.

Beard 

In addition to the lost nose, a ceremonial pharaonic beard is thought to have been attached, although this may have been added in later periods after the original construction. Egyptologist Vassil Dobrev has suggested that had the beard been an original part of the Sphinx, it would have damaged the chin of the statue upon falling. The lack of visible damage supports his theory that the beard was a later addition.

Residues of red pigment are visible on areas of the Sphinx's face and traces of yellow and blue pigment have also been found elsewhere on the Sphinx, leading Mark Lehner to suggest that the monument "was once decked out in gaudy comic book colours". However, as with the case of many ancient monuments, the pigments and colours have since deteriorated, resulting in the yellow/beige appearance it has today.

Holes and tunnels

Hole in the Sphinx's head 
Johann Helffrich visited the Sphinx during his travels in 1565–1566. He describes that a priest went into the head of the Sphinx, and when he spoke it was as if the Sphinx itself was speaking.

Many New Kingdom stelae depict the Sphinx wearing a crown. If it in fact existed, the hole could have been the anchoring point for it.

Émile Baraize closed the hole with a metal hatch in 1926.

Perring's Hole 

Howard Vyse directed Perring in 1837 to drill a tunnel in the back of the Sphinx, just behind the head. The hole was cleared in 1978. Among the rubble was a fragment of the Sphinx's nemes headdress.

Major fissure 

A major natural fissure in the bedrock cuts through the waist of the Sphinx, first excavated by Auguste Mariette in 1853.

Baraize, in 1926, sealed the sides and roofed it with iron bars, limestone and cement, and installed an iron trap door at the top. A very narrow crack continues deeper.

Rump passage 

In 1926 the Sphinx was cleared of sand under direction of Baraize, which revealed an opening to a tunnel at floor-level at the north side of the rump. It was subsequently closed by masonry veneer and nearly forgotten.

More than fifty years later, the existence of the passage was recalled by three elderly men who had worked during the clearing as basket carriers. This led to the rediscovery and excavation of the rump passage, in 1980.

The passage consists of an upper and a lower section, which are angled roughly 90 degrees to each other:

It terminated in a cul-de-sac pit at groundwater level. Among the sand and stone fragments, a piece of tin foil and the base of a modern ceramic water jar was found. The clogged bottom contained modern fill. Among it, more tin foil, modern cement and a pair of shoes.

It is possible that the entire passage was cut top down, beginning high up on the rump, and that the current access point at floor-level was made at a later date.

Vyse noted in his diary (February 27 and 28, 1837) that he was "boring" near the tail, which indicates him as the creator of the passage, as no other tunnel has been identified at this location. Another interpretation is that the shaft is of ancient origin, perhaps an exploratory tunnel or an unfinished tomb shaft.

Niche in northern flank 
A 1925 photograph shows a man standing below floor level in a niche in the Sphinx's core body. It was closed during the 1925-6 restorations.

Gap under southern large masonry box 
Another hole might have been at floor level in the large masonry box on the south side of the Sphinx.

Space behind Dream Stele 
The space behind the Dream Stele, between the paws of the Sphinx, was covered by an iron beam and cement roof, which was fitted with an iron trap door.

Keyhole Shaft 
At the ledge of the Sphinx enclosure, a square shaft is located opposite the northern hind paw. Lehner interprets the shaft to be an unfinished tomb and named it "Keyhole Shaft", because of cuttings in the ledge above the shaft that are shaped like the lower part of a keyhole, upside down.

Pseudohistory 
Numerous ideas have been suggested to explain or reinterpret the origin and identity of the Sphinx, that lack sufficient evidential support and/or are contradicted by such, and are therefore considered part of pseudohistory and pseudoarchaeology.

Ancient Astronauts/Atlantis 

 The Sphinx is oriented from west to east, towards the rising sun, in accordance with the ancient Egyptian solar cult. The Orion correlation theory posits that it was instead aligned to face the constellation of Leo during the vernal equinox around 10,500 BC. The idea is considered pseudoarchaeology by academia, because no textual or archaeological evidence supports this to be the reason for the orientation of the Sphinx.
 The Sphinx water erosion hypothesis contends that the main type of weathering evident on the enclosure walls of the Great Sphinx could only have been caused by prolonged and extensive rainfall, and must therefore predate the time of the pharaoh Khafre. The hypothesis was championed by René Schwaller de Lubicz, John Anthony West, and geologist Robert M. Schoch. The theory is considered pseudoarchaeology by mainstream scholarship due to archaeological, climatological and geological evidence to the contrary.
 There is a long history of speculation about hidden chambers beneath the Sphinx, by esoteric figures such as H. Spencer Lewis. Edgar Cayce specifically predicted in the 1930s that a "Hall of Records", containing knowledge from Atlantis, would be discovered under the Sphinx in 1998. His prediction fueled much of the fringe speculation that surrounded the Sphinx in the 1990s, which lost momentum when the hall was not found when predicted.
 Author Robert K. G. Temple proposes that the Sphinx was originally a statue of the jackal god Anubis, the god of funerals, and that its face was recarved in the likeness of a Middle Kingdom pharaoh, Amenemhet II. Temple bases his identification on the style of the eye make-up and style of the pleats on the headdress.

Racial characteristics 

Until the early 20th century, it was suggested that the face of the Sphinx had "Negroid" characteristics, as part of now outdated historical race concepts.

Other Alternative Ages
Geologist Colin Reader suggests that water runoff from the Giza plateau is responsible for the differential erosion on the walls of the sphinx enclosure. Because the hydrological characteristics of the area were significantly changed by the quarries, he contends this suggests that the sphinx likely predated the quarries (and thus, the pyramids). He points towards the larger cyclopean stones in part of the Sphinx Temple, as well as the causeway alignment with the pyramids and the break in the quarries, as evidence that the pyramids took the alignment with some pre-existing structure, such as the sphinx, into consideration when they were constructed, and that the sphinx temple was built in two distinct phases. He contends that such erosion could have occurred relatively rapidly and suggests that the sphinx was no more than a few centuries older than present archaeology would suggest, suggesting an origin from the late pre-Dynastic or early Dynastic era, when Ancient Egyptians already were known to be capable of sophisticated masonry.

Gallery

See also 
 Sphinx of Memphis
 Sphinx of Taharqo
 African lions in culture
 Lion (heraldry)
 List of colossal sculpture in situ
 List of tallest statues

Notes

References

Bibliography

External links 
 
 Riddle of the Sphinx
 Egyptian and Greek Sphinxes
 Egypt—The Lost Civilization Theory
 The Sphinx's Nose
 What happened to the Sphinx's nose? 
 Sphinx photo gallery
 Al Maqrizi's account 
 The Age of the Sphinx by Brian Dunning

 
Buildings and structures completed in the 27th century BC
Colossal statues in Egypt
Giza pyramid complex
Monoliths
Art of ancient Egypt
Sculptures of ancient Egypt
Khafre
3rd-millennium BC establishments in Egypt
Limestone statues
Tourist attractions in Egypt
Sculptures of lions
Sphinxes